Cholinergic urticaria (CU) presents with tiny very itchy wheals and small bumps on a reddish background. 

It is a type of physical urticaria (or hives) that appears when a person is sweating or their core body temperature increases.

Symptoms
Cholinergic urticaria typically presents with a number of small, short-lasting hives but may also involve cutaneous inflammation (wheals) and pain which develops usually in response to exercise, bathing, staying in a heated environment, or emotional stress. Although the symptoms subside rapidly, commonly within 1 hour, cholinergic urticaria may significantly impair quality of life, especially in relation to sporting activities.

Causes
 Sweat hypersensitivity
 Acquired anhidrosis and/or hypohidrosis
 Idiopathic
 Opioid use
Cholinesterase inhibitors

Subtypes

Sweat hypersensitivity
This subtype of CU refers to those who are hypersensitive to their own sweat.

Diagnosis
Diagnosis is made by injecting autologous (the person's own) sweat into the skin.

Features
The hives are observed to coincide with perspiration points of sweating.

Pathophysiology
Tanaka et al. found that the sweat hyper-sensitivities of CU and atopic dermatitis seem to be virtually the same, and therefore, the sweat-induced histamine release from basophils may also be mediated by a specific IgE for sweat in atopic dermatitis as well as CU.

Treatment
 Proposed first-line treatment: Rapid desensitization protocol using autologous sweat.
 Non-pharmacological treatment: Forced perspiration by excessive body warming (hot bath or exercise) used daily may reduce the symptoms through exhaustion of inflammatory mediators. This non-pharmacological treatment is contraindicated in those with CU as a result of hypohidrosis (see below).
 Antihistamines are a commonly prescribed first-line treatment for conventional urticaria, but its effectiveness in the treatment of CU is rather limited in most cases. Some research suggests that first-generation antihistamines with anticholinergic properties such as diphenhydramine are most successful at treating CU. 
 Treatment(s) with mixed success: omalizumab (anti-IgE therapy), danazol (synthetic androgen), propranolol (beta blocker), zileuton (antileukotriene).

Acquired anhidrosis and/or hypohidrosis
This subtype of CU refers to those who have abnormally reduced sweating.

Diagnosis
Sweat is readily visualized by a topical indicator such as iodinated starch or sodium alizarin sulphonate. Both undergo a dramatic colour change when moistened by sweat. A thermoregulatory sweat test evaluates the body's response to a thermal stimulus by inducing sweating through the use of a hot box ⁄ room, thermal blanket or exercise. Failure of the topical indicator to undergo a colour change during thermoregulatory sweat testing can indicate anhidrosis and/or hypohidrosis (see Minor test).

A skin biopsy may reveal cellular infiltrates in sweat glands or ducts.

Features
Severe heat intolerance (e.g., nausea, dizziness, and headache), and tingling, pricking, pinchy or burning pain over the entire body on exposure to hot environments or prolonged exercise which improve after cooling the body. Occurs in the absence of any causative skin, metabolic, or neurological disorders.

Pathophysiology

 The wheals, hypohidrosis, and pain seems to result from the low expression levels of acetylcholinesterase (AchE) and cholinergic receptor, muscarinic 3 (CHRM3) in the eccrine gland epithelial cells.

Elevated expression levels of CCL2/MCP-1, CCL5/RANTES and CCL17/TARC which result in chemoattracted CD4+ and CD8+ T cell populations to the surrounding area may be responsible for exerting a downmodulatory effect on the AchE and CHRM3 expressions.

Corticosteroid inhibits the expressions of CCL2/MCP-1, CCL5/RANTES and CCL17/TARC. This further support the notion that CCL2/MCP-1, CCL5/RANTES and CCL17/TARC play a crucial role.

Treatment

 First-line treatment:  H1RAs are first-line therapy for patients with CholU, but many patients show only a mild to moderate response to standard H1RA doses. The addition of an H2RA was reported to be effective in patients with refractory CholU that was unresponsive to up-dosing of an H1RA. Other studies have demonstrated the efficacy of scopolamine butylbromide (an anticholinergic agent); combinations of propranolol (a b2-adrenergic blocker), antihistamines, and montelukast; and treatment and injection with botulinum toxin. 
 Non-pharmacological treatment: In the absence of sweat, cold-water sprays and wet towels can be used to increase the evaporative loss of heat from the skin. Shifting to a cooler or air-conditioned environments when necessary can also reduce discomfort. In the event of severe hyperthermia (body temperature >106 °F/41 °C), drastic measures such as immersion in ice-cold water are necessary to prevent irreversible brain damage.

Idiopathic
Unknown or unclassified at this time. This represents those who do not fall under any of the above categories.

Prevalence
Though overall research is limited, various studies indicate that CU is relatively common across populations with prevalence rates reportedly ranging from 5% to 20% (depending on locale, race, and age). The condition is more common in young adults, and prevalence appears to peak in adults aged 26–28 (up to 20%). The vast majority of cases are reported to be mild, and proportionally few individuals seek medical attention regarding the condition.

History
Cholinergic urticaria was first described by Duke in 1924 as "urticaria calorica". The term cholinergic is derived from the finding that hives similar to those of CU can be evoked using cholinergic agonists (e.g. methacholine).

See also
 Miliaria
 Exercise-induced anaphylaxis
 Idiopathic pure sudomotor failure
 Hypohidrosis
 Fabry disease
 Aquagenic urticaria

References

External links 

Urticaria and angioedema